The Brockville railway station in Brockville, Ontario, Canada is served by Via Rail trains running from Toronto to Ottawa and Montreal. It is a staffed railway station, with ticket sales, outdoor parking, telephones, washrooms, and wheelchair access to the platform and trains.

Railway services
As of January 2023, Brockville station is served by two domestic routes (with connections) provided by Via Rail the primary passenger rail operator in Canada.

Ottawa - Toronto Route 

 No local service between Ottawa and Fallowfield, or Guildwood and Toronto on these trains.

Montreal - Toronto Route

 No local service between Montréal and Dorval, or Guildwood and Toronto on these trains.

Refurbishment plans

Via Rail announced in November 2009 that it would replace the historic 1872 Brockville station with a new $7-million facility. The initial proposal was scaled back; on November 10, 2010, Via Rail unveiled a second proposed design for a new station building. The  building was to cost $4.5 million CDN and would have been wheelchair accessible, with space to accommodate expanded track lines.

Once the proposed development was to have been completed, the old railway station building was planned to be demolished; that move met with local opposition. As passenger volumes remain low, Via returned to the drawing board and proposed a million-dollar renovation of the existing station with a new roof, exterior brick, lighting, doors, and windows. An automatic door and accessibility improvements would be added for people with disabilities, and a building adjacent to the station would be demolished and replaced with a passenger shelter. According to Brockville mayor David Henderson, "It's clearly something that set off some alarm bells in the local community, because we do have a very historical aspect to this old city. What was good is that Via Rail, and the people at Via Rail, they responded." The renovations were completed in July 2015.

References

External links

Buildings and structures in Brockville
Via Rail stations in Ontario
Railway stations in Canada opened in 1872
Rail transport in Brockville
Canadian National Railway stations in Ontario
History of Leeds and Grenville United Counties